Ryan A. Jorden (born April 11, 1973) is an American soccer coach who currently coaches the UCLA Bruins men's soccer program. Jorden had previously coached the Pacific Tigers and the California Baptist University Lancers programs. Jorden, known for his coaching ability at California Baptist University transferred to UCLA.

Career

Playing 
Ryan Jorden played four seasons of college soccer for Westmont College, from 1991 until 1994. With Westmont, the Warriors made two NAIA appearances.

Coaching 
On April 29, 2019, Jorden was announced as the head coach of the UCLA Bruins men's soccer program. This hiring came following the resignation and indictment of previous head coach Jorge Salcedo for his alleged participation in the 2019 college admissions bribery scandal.

Coaching record

References

External links 
 Ryan Jordan at UCLA
 

1973 births
Living people
California Baptist Lancers men's soccer coaches
Colorado State Rams women's soccer coaches
Oregon State Beavers men's soccer coaches
Pacific Tigers men's soccer coaches
Soccer players from California
Sportspeople from Santa Barbara County, California
UCLA Bruins men's soccer coaches
Westmont Warriors men's soccer players
American soccer coaches
Association footballers not categorized by position
Association football players not categorized by nationality